Barbara K. Mistick is the president of the National Association of Independent Colleges and Universities. She assumed the presidency in September, 2019. She was formerly the president of Wilson College from July 2011 to August 2019.

Mistick helped the private non-profit higher education sector navigate the U.S. Federal Government's response to the pandemic and the various rounds of relief funding.

Biography 
Mistick earned her her B.S. in Business from Carlow University in 1991. She then attended the University of Pittsburgh Katz Graduate School of Business where she earned her MBA in 1993. In 2004, Mistick earned her doctorate in Management from Weatherhead School of Management at Case Western Reserve University. From June 2005 to June 2011, Mistick was the first woman President and Director of the Carnegie Library of Pittsburgh.

Mistick is the co-author of Stretch: How to Future-Proof Yourself for Tomorrow's Workplace.

In 2008, Barbara K. Mistick, then the president and director of the Carnegie Library of Pittsburgh and David M. Shribman, the executive editor of the Pittsburgh Post-Gazette worked together to produce "Pittsburgh 1758 - 2008."

References 

Wilson College (Pennsylvania)
Women heads of universities and colleges
Heads of universities and colleges in the United States
1955 births
Living people